Dada Maheshvarananda (born May 11, 1953) is a yogic monk, activist, writer and the founder of the Prout Research Institute of Venezuela.

Since becoming a monk in Ananda Marga, Maheshvarananda has taught meditation, yoga and the Progressive Utilization Theory (PROUT) globally.

Early life

Southeast Asia
From 1979 to 1991 Maheshvarananda taught meditation and yoga in Indonesia and the Philippines (also known as "Maharlika").

Brazil
From 1992 to 2003 Maheshvarananda worked in Brazil, where he participated in Eco-92 and the World Social Forum.

Venezuela
Maheshvarananda and José Albarrán founded the Prout Research Institute of Venezuela in Caracas, an independent, not-for-profit foundation.

Publications

“Go with the Flow” (1985)
"A Personal Remembrance and Conversation with Paulo Freire, Educator of the Oppressed" in Neohumanist Educational Futures: Liberating the Pedagogical Intellect, edited by Sohail Inayatullah, Marcus Bussey and Ivana Milojević, Tapei, Tamkang University Press, 2006.
“Revolutionary Consciousness: Development as transformation” in Development 46, (1 December 2003).
“Will Organized Religions Survive in the New Millennium?” in New Renaissance, Vol. 9, Number 3.
“Ideal Leadership”
"Spirituality and Social Change"
"The Human Costs of Economic Meltdown and its Alternative"
"A New Social Paradigm Based On Spiritual Values" on Znet.
Published with Mariah Branch, The Progressive Utilization Theory (Prout): Alternative Economic and Social Model for the Welfare of All” (2010) in WorkingUSA: The Journal of Labor and Society.After Capitalism: Prout's Vision for a New World (2003, Proutist Universal Publications)  (paperback), published in 10 languages.After Capitalism: Economic Democracy in Action (2012, Innerworld Publications)  (paperback)Cooperative Games for a Cooperative World: Facilitating Trust, Communication and Spiritual Connection'' (2017, InnerWorld Publications)  (paperback), published in three languages.

See also
 Prabhat Ranjan Sarkar
 Ananda Sutram

References

External links
Prout Research Institute of Venezuela

1953 births
Living people
American pacifists
American monks
Activists from Philadelphia